Cheng Ming (born February 11, 1986, in Jilin City, China) is a Chinese archer. At the 2012 Summer Olympics she competed for her country in the Women's team event, where China won the silver medal, and the individual event, reaching the third round where she was knocked out by Khatuna Lorig.

See also 
 China at the 2012 Summer Olympics

References

External links
 

Chinese female archers
1986 births
Living people
Olympic archers of China
Archers at the 2012 Summer Olympics
Olympic silver medalists for China
Olympic medalists in archery
Sportspeople from Jilin City
Medalists at the 2012 Summer Olympics
Asian Games medalists in archery
Archers at the 2010 Asian Games
Archers at the 2014 Asian Games
Asian Games silver medalists for China
Medalists at the 2010 Asian Games
Medalists at the 2014 Asian Games
20th-century Chinese women
21st-century Chinese women